Sornay may refer to:

Sornay, Haute-Saône, a commune in the French region of Franche-Comté
Sornay, Saône-et-Loire, a commune in the French region of Bourgogne